True Blue is a tone of blue deeper than powder blue and lighter than royal blue that was the color for all of the athletic teams of the University of California, Los Angeles (UCLA) from 2003 to 2017. It was developed by the UCLA Athletic Department and Adidas and first introduced on home football jerseys and away basketball jerseys in 2002.

Previously, the football team had worn powder blue while the basketball team wore royal blue. Fan merchandise spanned many shades of blue. The UCLA Marching Band incorporated True Blue into its previous navy blue uniforms in 2007. The color of the frame holding the Victory Bell was painted True Blue when UCLA was in possession of the bell after a football victory over the USC Trojans.

True Blue was replaced by Powderkeg Blue for the 2017-18 season, when UCLA switched to Under Armour as its apparel provider. In 2021, UCLA Athletics aligned its blue with UCLA Blue, which was previously adopted by the school's academic and administrative units.

True Blue is Pantone Matching System color 2386 C. The color True Blue is a deep tone of azure.

See also
 List of colors
 UCLA Bruins football uniforms

References

External links

Shades of azure
Shades of blue
School colors
UCLA Bruins
2003 introductions